Gubavčevo Polje is a village in Croatia.

Population

According to the 2011 census, Gubavčevo Polje had 3 inhabitants.

Napomena: Till 1948 it was part of the settlement (hamlet). In census period 1857–1880 data is include in the settlement of Kijani.

1991 census

According to the 1991 census, settlement of Gubavčevo Polje had 59 inhabitants, which were ethnically declared as this:

Austro-hungarian 1910 census

According to the 1910 census, settlement of Gubavčevo Polje had 426 inhabitants in 3 hamlets, which were linguistically and religiously declared as this:

Literature 

  Savezni zavod za statistiku i evidenciju FNRJ i SFRJ, popis stanovništva 1948, 1953, 1961, 1971, 1981. i 1991. godine.
 Knjiga: "Narodnosni i vjerski sastav stanovništva Hrvatske, 1880–1991: po naseljima, author: Jakov Gelo, izdavač: Državni zavod za statistiku Republike Hrvatske, 1998., ;

References

External links

Populated places in Zadar County
Lika
Serb communities in Croatia